"Ghetto Fabulous" is the lead single released from Ras Kass second album, Rasassination. Produced by Stu-B-Doo, the song featured a verse from Dr. Dre and a chorus by Mack 10. Though "Ghetto Fabulous" had a more commercial sound to it than his previous singles, it was not a commercial success, only making it to 56 on Hot R&B/Hip-Hop Singles & Tracks. The video also features Ice-T.

On the B-side was the song "H2O Proof", produced by Big Jaz and featuring Saafir, a member of the "Golden State Project" rap group alongside Xzibit and Ras Kass.

The outro of the video mix version of "Been There, Done That" by Dr. Dre is sampled in Ghetto Fabulous.

Track listing

References

1998 singles
Ras Kass songs
Dr. Dre songs
Mack 10 songs
Songs written by Dr. Dre
1998 songs
Priority Records singles